Iliyan Popov (Bulgarian: Илиян Попов; born 2 June 1998) is a Bulgarian footballer who plays as a defender for Botev Ihtiman.

Career

Vitosha Bistritsa
On 9 July 2017 Popov signed with Bulgarian First League club Vitosha Bistritsa, arriving from Levski Sofia's Academy. He made his debut on 22 July 2017 in a match against Etar Veliko Tarnovo.

Career statistics

Club

References

External links
 

1998 births
Living people
Bulgarian footballers
Association football defenders
FC Vitosha Bistritsa players
FC Strumska Slava Radomir players
FC Yantra Gabrovo players
First Professional Football League (Bulgaria) players
Second Professional Football League (Bulgaria) players
Sportspeople from Burgas